Charles Antoine Perreault is a Canadian actor from Quebec. He is most noted for his performance in the 2010 film A Life Begins (Une vie qui commence), for which he received a Jutra Award nomination for Best Actor at the 14th Jutra Awards in 2012.

He also appeared in the film The Fall of Sparta (La Chute de Sparte), and had supporting roles in the television series District 31 and Fugueuse.

References

External links

21st-century Canadian male actors
Canadian male child actors
Canadian male film actors
Canadian male television actors
French Quebecers
Male actors from Quebec
Living people
Year of birth missing (living people)